Saint Camillus International University of Health Sciences (UniCamillus) is a private University recognised by the Italian Ministry of Education, University and Research in November 2017. It is located in Rome.

Profile 
UniCamillus is dedicated exclusively to Medical Sciences and is reported to be aimed particularly at non-EU international students, as well as EU students who show a scientific and professional interest towards health issues affecting the Developing Countries (PVS).  

In the vision of a humanitarian commitment that the university declares to pursue, it was also reported the signature of a memorandum of understanding with the Association of the Physicians of Foreign Origin in Italy (AMSI) and the Communities of the Arab World in Italy (Co-mai)  as well as co-operation agreements with Haiti, Egypt and other non-European countries

Degree courses 
The university's curricula show that the didactic programs as well as the research activities focus on the pathologies at the root of the most common health issues in the Global South such as Malaria, Hiv/AIDS, Tuberculosis and Neglected Tropical Diseases, as well as the specific requirements for physicians and health professionals operating in war zones or natural disaster areas. All courses are taught in English.

 Degree Course in Medicine and Surgery
 Three-year Degree Course in Midwifery 
 Three-year Degree Course in Nursing
 Three-year Degree Course in Physiotherapy
 Three-year Degree Course in Biomedical Laboratory Techniques
 Three-year Degree Course in Radiology, Diagnostic Imaging and Radiotherapy Techniques

References

External links 
 Institutional website www.unicamillus.org
 UniCamillus page on Universitaly-Cineca

Universities and colleges in Rome
2017 establishments in Italy
Educational institutions established in 2017